Dancesport at the 2017 Asian Indoor and Martial Arts Games was held in Ashgabat, Turkmenistan from 25 to 26 September 2017 at the Taekwondo and Dancesport Arena.

Medalists

Standard

Latin

Salsa

Medal table

Results

Standard

Quickstep
25 September

Slow foxtrot
25 September

Tango
25 September

Viennese waltz
25 September

Waltz
25 September

Latin

Cha-cha-cha
26 September

Jive
26 September

Paso doble
26 September

Rumba
26 September

Samba
26 September

Salsa

Salsa on one
25 September

References 
 Medalists by events

External links
 Official website

2017 Asian Indoor and Martial Arts Games events
2017
Asian